Katonisi ("lower island") is an uninhabited islet close to the southern coast of Crete in the Libyan Sea. It is administered from the municipality of Sfakia, in Chania regional unit.

See also
List of islands of Greece

Landforms of Chania (regional unit)
Uninhabited islands of Crete
Islands of Greece